Diego Marcelo Ceballos (born March 25, 1980 in Santa Fe, Argentina) is an Argentine former professional footballer who works as a football agent at MG ELITE SPORT.

Teams
  Club Atlético Platense 2000–2001
  Gimnasia y Esgrima de Concepción del Uruguay 2002
  Club Atlético Nueva Chicago 2002–2003
  Quilmes Atlético Club 2003–2004
  Club Atlético Banfield 2004–2005
  Club Atlético Lanús 2005
  Liga Deportiva Universitaria (Quito) 2006
  Talleres de Córdoba 2006–2007
  Quilmes Atlético Club 2007–2008
  Club Atlético San Martín de San Juan 2008–2009
  Club Atlético Platense 2009–2010
  Deportivo Merlo 2010–2011
  Lobos de la BUAP 2011
  Almirante Brown de Isidro Casanova 2012–2014
  Brown 2014
  Deportivo Camioneros 2015–2016
  Deportivo Laferrere 2016

References
 
 
 
 Diego Marcelo Ceballos at SoccerPunter.com

1980 births
Living people
Argentine footballers
Argentine expatriate footballers
Club Atlético Platense footballers
San Martín de San Juan footballers
Club Atlético Lanús footballers
Club Atlético Banfield footballers
Nueva Chicago footballers
Deportivo Merlo footballers
Talleres de Córdoba footballers
Quilmes Atlético Club footballers
L.D.U. Quito footballers
Expatriate footballers in Ecuador
Association footballers not categorized by position
Footballers from Santa Fe, Argentina